Luděk Pernica (born 12 December 1949) is a Czech athlete. He competed in the men's decathlon at the 1976 Summer Olympics.

References

1949 births
Living people
Athletes (track and field) at the 1976 Summer Olympics
Czech decathletes
Olympic athletes of Czechoslovakia
Sportspeople from Nový Jičín